The Royal Lion Hotel is a hotel in Lyme Regis, Dorset, England. It lies to the northwest of the Lyme Regis Museum, about 100 metres from the sea. It is a former coaching inn, dated to 1610 (although the official site claims 1601).

The hotel has 33 bedrooms and leisure facilities including a swimming pool and sauna. From 2002 until 2022 it was run by Leslie Stone, when it was taken over by brewery Hall & Woodhouse.

References

External links
Official Website

Coaching inns
Buildings and structures completed in 1610
Buildings and structures in Lyme Regis
Hotels in Dorset
1610 establishments in England